NATO, released on 10 October 1994, is a studio album by Slovenian industrial group Laibach, named after the North Atlantic Treaty Organization. It is a selection of cover versions with the theme of war.

Track listing
 "Nato" – 5:45 (original Mars - the Bringer of War by Gustav Holst)
 "War" – 4:10 (original by The Temptations)
 "Final Countdown" – 5:40 (original by Europe)
 "In the Army Now" – 4:31 (original by Bolland)
 "Dogs of War" – 4:43 (original by Pink Floyd)
 "Alle gegen alle" – 3:52 (original by Deutsch Amerikanische Freundschaft)
 "National Reservation" – 3:46 (original "Indian Reservation" by Paul Revere & the Raiders)
 "2525" – 3:48 (original by Zager and Evans)
 "Mars on River Drina" – 4:48 (original March on River Drina by Stanislav Binički)

References

1994 albums
Laibach (band) albums
Mute Records albums
Covers albums